The 2012 Shepherd Rams football team represented Shepherd University during the 2012 NCAA Division II football season as a member of the West Virginia Intercollegiate Athletic Conference (WVIAC). They were led by head coach Monte Cater, in his 26th season at Shepherd, and finished the season 83. With a conference mark of 71, they were named WVIAC champions and advanced to the Division II Playoffs, losing in the first round against IUP.

The Rams played their home games at Ram Stadium in Shepherdstown, West Virginia.

This was the final year for the WVIAC, as most of the teams in the conference withdrew to form the Mountain East Conference for the 2013 season.

Regular season
The 2012 regular season for the Rams consisted of eight games against WVIAC opponents, and one game each against American International and Shippensburg. Shepherd finished the regular season 82, and advanced to the NCAA Division II playoffs.

Playoffs
Shepherd lost in the first round of the payoffs, 1727, against IUP.

Schedule

References

Shepherd
Shepherd Rams football seasons
Shepherd Rams football